Union of Italian Communists (Marxist–Leninist) was a pro-Chinese communist group in Italy. The UCI(m-l) was founded in Rome on 4 October 1968. Its main organ was Servire il popolo. The main leaders of UCI(m-l) were Aldo Brandirali, Enzo Todeschini, Angelo Arvati and Enzo Lo Giudice.

After a schism at the end of 1970, the main group of the leaders moved from Rome to Milan. 

On 15 April 1972 the UCI(m-l) was transformed into Italian (Marxist–Leninist) Communist Party (Partito Comunista (marxista-leninista) Italiano). With the appearance of the Leninist poet Francesco Leonetti in the party, the theoretical organ of PC(m-l)I became known as Che fare. 

The PC(m-l)I had a front organization amongst Italians in West Germany, called Union of Italian Migrant Workers (Federazione Italiani Lavoratori Emigrati).

The PC(m-l)I was dissolved in 1978, and its remaining adherents largely became involved in Autonomia Operaia.

The youth wing of the organization was called: Union of Communist Youth in Service of the People.

1968 establishments in Italy
1978 disestablishments in Italy
Defunct communist parties in Italy
Maoist organizations in Europe
Defunct political parties in Italy
Political parties established in 1968
Political parties disestablished in 1978